Tsai Min-you (born 12 November 1986), better known as Evan Yo, is a Taiwanese Mandopop singer-songwriter. He was signed by his management company at 14 and has been signed by Sony Music Taiwan since 2006. He has released four albums and was nominated for Best New Artist in 2007 at the 18th Golden Melody Awards, Taiwan.

Tsai graduated from the Music Department of National Taiwan Normal University. He majored in the violin.

Filmography

Television series

Commercials
 (2004) La New Freshmen Air Shoes
 (2006) KFC French Salmon Roll
 (2008) "A Sa Mu" Milk Tea

Discography

Studio albums

Soundtrack Contributions

Awards and nominations

References

External links
 Evan Yo@Sony Music Taiwan
 Evan Yo discography@Sony Music Taiwan
 Evan Yo's official blog

1986 births
Living people
Taiwanese Mandopop singer-songwriters
Musicians from Taipei
National Taiwan Normal University alumni
Affiliated Senior High School of National Taiwan Normal University alumni
Writers from Taipei
21st-century Taiwanese  male singers